Grevillea tripartita   is a shrub in the family Proteaceae. It is endemic to Western Australia, occurring in proximity to the south coast between the east of the Stirling Range and Point Culver.

Description
It has an erect habit and  usually grows to between 0.6 and 3 metres in height The red and yellow flowers appear in terminal racemes, predominantly from August to December but also at other times of the year.

Taxonomy
The species was first formally described by Swiss botanist Carl Meissner in 1856 in the Prodromus Systematis Naturalis Regni Vegetabilis.

Two subspecies are recognised:
Grevillea tripartita subsp. macrostylis (F.Muell.) Makinson (leaf margins revolute)
Grevillea tripartita Meisn. subsp. tripartita (leaf margins recurved)

Distribution
The shrub has a range extending from around Stirling Range National Park in the southwest to the Dunn Rock Nature reserve to the north with the bulk of the population found around Ravensthorpe in the east but with isolated populations extending further east to the Nuytsland Nature Reserve at Point Culver. It is usually found growing in clay or sandy soils.

See also
 List of Grevillea species

References

tripartita
Endemic flora of Western Australia
Eudicots of Western Australia
Proteales of Australia
Taxa named by Carl Meissner
Plants described in 1856